Ceriscoides turgida (syn. Gardenia turgida), the mountain gardenia, is a species of flowering plant in the family Rubiaceae, native to the Indian Subcontinent and mainland Southeast Asia. A tree reaching , its unripe fruit can be boiled and eaten as a famine food, but its ripe fruit are poisonous.

References

Gardenieae
Flora of the Indian subcontinent
Flora of Indo-China
Plants described in 1978